Oxydisia is a monotypic snout moth genus described by George Hampson in 1901. Its single species, Oxydisia hyperythrella, described by the same author, is known from Australia.

References

Moths described in 1901
Phycitini
Monotypic moth genera
Moths of Australia
Pyralidae genera